Meltdown: A Free-Market Look at Why the Stock Market Collapsed, the Economy Tanked, and the Government Bailout Will Make Things Worse is a book on the global financial crisis of 2007–2008 by historian Thomas Woods, with a foreword by Ron Paul. The book was published on February 9, 2009 by Regnery Publishing.

Overview
Woods is a follower of the Austrian School of economics and believes in allowing the market to freely compete in currency, which he believes would lead to mostly gold-based currency. The book is dedicated to Murray Rothbard and Ron Paul.  The book debuted at #16 on the "Hardcover, non-fiction" New York Times Best Seller list, and advanced to the #11 spot in its second week on the list. According to the author's official website, Meltdown was on the NYT Best Seller list for 10 weeks.

Woods' thesis maintains that: deflation of prices neither causes nor prolongs depressions; deflation may be necessary to prevent depressions or to bring depressions to an end; the Fed is the primary cause of business cycles via its arbitrary and coercive control of the money supply; and trying to cure these credit cycles with more government intervention will not work.

Woods argues that government intervention in the form of support for housing and excessive monetary expansion caused the current crisis. By creating an illusion of wealth (that certain resources exist which do not exist), interventions encourage wasteful investments and unsustainable consumption, instead of productive investments. The proposed cures (bailouts, more money creation, and stimulus spending) will just make matters worse. No business is really too big to fail, he says, even large financial institutions.  For them, as for other businesses, liquidation is preferable to a bailout from the perspective of the larger economy.

According to Woods, the depressions of the 19th century were caused by banks (various state banks and the Second Bank of the United States) issuing paper money, supposedly convertible to gold, in amounts greatly exceeding their gold reserves.

See also

 Great Recession in the United States
 The Politically Incorrect Guide to American History

Notes

References
 Meltdown: A Free-Market Look at Why the Stock Market Collapsed, the Economy Tanked, and Government Bailouts Will Make Things Worse (2009)  &

External links
 Washington Times review
 Woods at Mises.org
 Source of some statistics used in Meltdown
 ISBNdb.com review
 lewrockwell.com review
 Another free market view of the crisis

2009 non-fiction books
Bank failures
Finance books
Austrian School publications
Non-fiction books about the Great Recession